Latifa bint Fahd Al Saud (1959 – December 2013) was a member of the Saudi royal family, House of Saud. She was one of King Fahd's children.

Biography
Princess Latifa was the eldest daughter of King Fahd and Al Anoud bint Abdulaziz bin Musaed Al Jiluwi. Her full brothers included Faisal bin Fahd, Mohammed bin Fahd, Sultan bin Fahd, Saud bin Fahd and Khalid bin Fahd. In Riyadh she founded Princess Latifa bint Fahd Center which provides support for patients who are treated at King Fahd Medical City.

In September 2013 Princess Latifa bought a historical Geneva estate from a wealthy family, Nordmann, for $62m. As of 2013 it was the second-highest price on record for an estate in the city. Then she settled and lived there until December 2013 when she died at age 54. Funeral ceremony was held for her at Imam Turki bin Abdullah Mosque in Riyadh following the noon prayer.

References

Latifa
Latifa
1959 deaths
2013 deaths
Latifa
Latifa
Latifa
Latifa